Libres is the Spanish version of the debut album of the Italian band Sonohra, winners of the "Giovani" category at the Sanremo Music Festival 2008.

Libres has 14 songs in the style of romantic rock, with guitars as the main instrument.  The first single from the CD in Latin America was Besos Fáciles, followed by Buscando L'amor.

Track listing 
 Besos fáciles - 3:55
 Buscando l'amor - 3:48
 Libres - 3:46
 Cinco mil manos - 3:14
 Un amor lleno de amor - 3:42 
 Hay que bailar - 4:11
 Sálvame - 5:56 
 Soy así - 4:11
 Aire de musica - 3:33 
 Cada vez eres mas - 3:53
 Creeré - 3:46
 BONUS Love show (English Version) - 3:55
 BONUS L'amore - 3:48
 BONUS Io e te - 3:42

References

Sonohra albums
2009 albums
Spanish-language albums

es:Libres